Ghent is a home rule-class city along the south bank of the Ohio River in Carroll County, Kentucky, in the United States. The population was 323 at the 2010 census.

Geography
Ghent is located in northeastern Carroll County at  (38.736116, -85.060225), along the Ohio River. The community is located on U.S. Route 42 at Kentucky Route 47. Ghent is north of Interstate 71.

Ghent is on the opposite side of the Ohio River from Vevay, Indiana, but the towns are not linked by a bridge. Ferry service between these two river cities spanned 175 years from 1802 to 1977.

History
Ghent was settled at the end of eighteenth century and was first known as McCool's Creek Settlement. The town was laid out in 1814. Henry Clay is alleged to have suggested the name, derived from the city of Ghent (then part of the Netherlands and now part of Belgium), where the treaty ending the War of 1812 was signed between the United States and the United Kingdom on Christmas Eve, 1814. Ghent's post office opened in 1816. On January 17, 1839, the Kentucky General Assembly formally established the city of Ghent and appointed Theodoric Fisher, Samuel Sanders Jr., James Knox, John C. Lindsey, and Richard Sarlls as its trustees.

In August 1864, in a skirmish during the Civil War in what was known as the Gex Landing Incident, members of the African-American United States Colored Troops and the United States Colored Cavalry engaged with CSA troops seeking to rescue local resident James Southard, a ferryman and Confederate sympathizer who had been arrested. USCT soldiers suffered an undetermined number of casualties.

Demographics

As of the census of 2000, there were 371 people, 125 households, and 103 families residing in the city. The racial makeup of the city was 89.49% White, 5.93% African American, 3.50% from other races, and 1.08% from two or more races. Hispanic or Latino of any race were 6.20% of the population.

There were 125 households, out of which 36.0% had children under the age of 18 living with them, 56.8% were married couples living together, 15.2% had a female householder with no husband present, and 17.6% were non-families. 14.4% of all households were made up of individuals, and 6.4% had someone living alone who was 65 years of age or older. The average household size was 2.97 and the average family size was 3.17.

In the city, the population was spread out, with 27.8% under the age of 18, 8.4% from 18 to 24, 29.1% from 25 to 44, 21.8% from 45 to 64, and 12.9% who were 65 years of age or older. The median age was 34 years. For every 100 females, there were 102.7 males. For every 100 females age 18 and over, there were 94.2 males.

The median income for a household in the city was $37,917, and the median income for a family was $39,028. Males had a median income of $32,031 versus $17,813 for females. The per capita income for the city was $17,106. About 8.6% of families and 12.8% of the population were below the poverty line, including 22.0% of those under age 18 and 3.0% of those age 65 or over.

Climate
The climate in this area is characterized by hot, humid summers and generally mild to cool winters.  According to the Köppen Climate Classification system, Ghent has a humid subtropical climate, abbreviated "Cfa" on climate maps.

Notable people
 Edwin Otway Burnham (1824–1873), a rifle-shooting Presbyterian missionary who moved to Sioux Indian territory and who was said could bark a squirrel, swing an axe or dispense Gospel with equal fervor and efficiency. His father, Dr. Frederick Burnham, had moved to Ghent to recover from injuries he sustained in the War of 1812.
 Nancy Diuguid (1948-2003), daughter of tobacco farmer Gex Lillard Diuguid and Elizabeth Lineback, was a globally active theatre director who worked in England and South Africa. She grew up in Ghent.
 Rutus Sarlls (1848-1913), European American early settler of South McAlester, Indian Territory who secured property rights for non Native Americans and secured a victory in the United States Supreme Court around the sale of malt beverages to Native Americans.  Sarlls grew up in Ghent.

See also
 List of cities and towns along the Ohio River

References

External links
 Historical Images and Texts of Ghent, Kentucky

Cities in Carroll County, Kentucky
Cities in Kentucky
Kentucky populated places on the Ohio River
Populated places established in 1814